PinchukArtCentre is a private contemporary art centre, located in Kyiv with a collection of works by Ukrainian and international artists. The museum was opened on 16 September 2006 by the steel billionaire Victor Pinchuk.

The mission of the PinchukArtCentre mission is to exhibit new artistic production and collect national and international contemporary art. The centre's structure and focus consists of an international collection, temporary exhibitions, education programmes, publications, and scholarly research.

In 2007 and 2009, the PinchukArtCentre officially represented Ukraine at the Venice Biennale. Admission to the museum is free.

History
The PinchukArtCentre opened in 2006, founded by Victor Pinchuk, an industrialist originally from Dnipro.

In 2007 and 2009, PinchukArtCentre officially organized the Ukrainian Pavilion at the 52nd and 53rd Biennale in Venice. In 2011, the art centre presented the exhibition Future Generation Art Prize @ Venice - Ukrainian Collateral Event on the 54th Venice Biennale.

In late 2008, the centre announced the biennial PinchukArtCentre Prize, the first national prize for young artists up to 35 years old. 20 shortlisted artists were selected among more than 1100 applications and an international jury chose the winners of the Main Prize and two Special Prizes. Artem Volokitin from Kharkiv won the Main Prize, and Masha Shubina and Oleksii Salmanov got two Special Prizes. The PinchukArtCentre Prize award ceremony was held on December 4, 2009.

In 2011, the PinchukArtCentre Prize Expert Committee reviewed more than 1,000 applications received from young artists from Ukraine and abroad, and formed a shortlist of the Prize nominees. As part of a group exhibition of 20 shortlisted artists, 20 new artists’ statements, produced with the support of the PinchukArtCentre for the show, were presented at the art centre.

Laureates of the PinchukArtCentre Prize 2011 were announced at the award ceremony that took place on December 9, 2011, in Kyiv. The winner of the Main Prize was Mykyta Kadan; Zhanna Kadyrova and Serhiy Radkevych won two Special Prizes, and the Public Choice Prize went to Mykyta Shalennyi.

In October 2011 PinchukArtCentre opened an application call for the new Curatorial Platform, a two-year full-time program combining a theoretical and practical training in curatorial and exhibition work. The programme is open for all Ukrainians up to 30.

Based on the decision of the selection committee, the first Curatorial Platform participants, chosen from more than 130 applicants, were Lizaveta German (23 years, Kyiv), Tatiana Kochubynska (26 years, Kyiv), Oleksandr Mykhed (23 years, Kyiv), Maria Lanko (25 years, Kyiv) and Kateryna Radchenko (27 years, Odesa). These selected applicants started their two-year residency program in January 2012.

As of February 2012, the total number of PinchukArtCentre visitors since its opening reached over 1,475,000 people.

Future Generation Art Prize 
On December 1, 2009, the Victor Pinchuk Foundation established Future Generation Art Prize, an online art competition for artists 35 and under, with PinchukArtCentre organizing. 

The first jury of the prize included Daniel Birnbaum, Robert Storr, Okwui Enwezor, and Ai Weiwei. On June 29, 2010, seven members of the Selection Committee featuring competent and global art-professionals, selected 20 artists from more than 6,000 applications coming from 125 countries and divided over all continents. 

The biennial award consists of a $100,000 prize, $40,000 of which is required to go towards producing art to ensure that the winner continues working. Every two years (with an edition skipping a year in 2016), the PinchukArtCentre holds an exhibition of artists under 35 from around the globe and awards a grand prize. In 2019, they awarded additional special prizes of $20,000. Alongside the central exhibition held at the PinhukArtCentre, the show travels to Venice, Italy as an official collateral event of the Venice Biennale.

Past Winners

2010 

 Main Prize: Cinthia Marcelle. Special and Public Choice Award: Nicolae Mircea

2012 

 Main Prize: Lynette Yiadom-Boakye. Special Prize: Jonathas de Andrade, Marwa Arsanios, Micol Assael, Ahmet Öğüt, Rayyane Tabet. People's Choice Award: Meiro Koizumi

2014 

 Main Prize: Nástio Mosquito, Carlos Motta. Special Prize: Aslan Gaisumov, Nikita Kadan, Zhanna Kadyrova

2017 

 Main Prize: Dineo Seshee Bopape. Special Prize: Phoebe Boswell

2019 

 Main Prize: Emilija Škarnulytė. Special Prize: Cooking Sections, Gabriel Goliath

References

External links 
 Official site

Arts centers in Ukraine
Museums in Kyiv
Contemporary art galleries in Ukraine
Modern art museums
Ukrainian art
Art museums and galleries in Ukraine
Art museums established in 2006
2006 establishments in Ukraine